Hu Huiren (born 7 July 1977) is a Chinese professional field hockey player who represented China at the 2008 Summer Olympics in Beijing. The team finished last in their group, and finished 11th after beating South Africa.

References

External links
 

Chinese male field hockey players
Olympic field hockey players of China
Field hockey players at the 2008 Summer Olympics
1977 births
Living people
Asian Games medalists in field hockey
Field hockey players at the 2002 Asian Games
Field hockey players at the 2006 Asian Games
Field hockey players at the 2010 Asian Games
Asian Games silver medalists for China
Medalists at the 2006 Asian Games
Sportspeople from Guangdong